The white-eared cotton rat (Sigmodon leucotis) is a species of rodent in the family Cricetidae.
It is found only in Mexico.

References

Musser, G. G. and M. D. Carleton. 2005. Superfamily Muroidea. pp. 894–1531 in Mammal Species of the World a Taxonomic and Geographic Reference. D. E. Wilson and D. M. Reeder eds. Johns Hopkins University Press, Baltimore.

Cotton rats
Mammals described in 1902
Taxonomy articles created by Polbot
Endemic mammals of Mexico